Freedonia is a name for any of several fictitious nations. 

Freedonia may also refer to:

Principality of Freedonia, a defunct micronation
"Freedonia" (The West Wing), a television episode

See also
Fredonia (disambiguation)